Wilson matrix is the following  matrix having integers as elements:

This is the coefficient matrix of the following system of linear equations considered in a paper by J. Morris published in 1946:

Morris ascribes the source of the set of equations to one T. S. Wilson but no details about Wilson have been provided. The particular system of equations was used by Morris to illustrate the concept of ill-conditioned system of equations. The matrix  has been used as an example and for test purposes in many research papers and books over the years.

Properties
 is a symmetric matrix.
 is positive definite.
 has the factorisation  where .

Research problems spawned by Wilson matrix
A consideration of the condition number of the Wilson matrix has spawned several interesting research problems relating to condition numbers of matrices in certain special classes of matrices having some or all the special features of the Wilson matrix. In particular, the following special classes of matrices have been studied:

 the set of  nonsingular, symmetric matrices with integer entries between 1 and 10.
 the set of  positive definite, symmetric matrices with integer entries between 1 and 10.

An exhaustive computation of the condition numbers of the matrices in the above sets has yielded the following results:

References

Matrices